Greg Evtushevski (born May 4, 1965) is a Canadian retired professional ice hockey player. A career minor league player, Evtushevski played most of his professional career in Germany.

Born in St. Paul, Alberta, Evtushevski played junior hockey with the Kamloops Blazers of the Western Hockey League. He was drafted in the seventh round (125th overall) of the 1983 NHL Entry Draft by the New Jersey Devils. Although he played two seasons with the Devils' minor league affiliate Maine Mariners, he never made it to the National Hockey League. He played the majority of his career in Germany, spending eight seasons in the Deutsche Eishockey Liga with Krefelder EV, the Kassel Huskies and the Frankfurt Lions. He played in the 1994 World Ice Hockey Championship for Germany. He retired in 2002.

Career statistics

Awards
 WHL 	West First All-Star Team – 1985

References

1965 births
Living people
Canadian ice hockey right wingers
Frankfurt Lions players
Indianapolis Checkers players
Kassel Huskies players
Kalamazoo Wings (1974–2000) players
Kamloops Blazers players
Kamloops Junior Oilers players
Krefeld Pinguine players
Ice hockey people from Alberta
Maine Mariners players
New Jersey Devils draft picks
Ratingen EC players
Rote Teufel Bad Nauheim players
ECD Sauderland players
Canadian expatriate ice hockey players in Germany